Angria Bank is a bank, a shallow sunken atoll, on the continental shelf off the west coast of India. It has platform type coral reef.

The name Angria Bank is derived from the name of one of the most successful Naval Admiral of Maratha Empire, Kanhoji Angre, whose name was spelled Conajee Angria by the british.

Geography
It is a coral reef. The bottom is composed of sand, shells, and coral. The bank is steep-to on all sides, with great depths surrounding it.

Marine life
In late December 2019, the Wildlife Conservation Society of India launched an expedition to Angria Bank, discovering a coral reef that hadn't bleached yet. The government of India plans to designate Angria Bank as a marine protected reserve.

Angria Bank is known to have at least one laced moray eel, a school of schooling bannerfish, and a red knob sea star. Several common dolphins and Indo-Pacific bottlenose dolphins inhabit the deeper waters of the coast. During the 8-day expedition to Angria Bank that started on the 18th of December, over 150 species of corals and algae were documented with no visible signs of bleaching.

Tourism
, Angria Bank is accessible by a two-hour boat ride from Malvan, Maharashtra.  In 2008, Maharashtra state Finance Minister Jayant Patil announced a Rs 50 million initiative to explore Angria Bank to determine the feasibility of further marine tourism in the area.

The first ever underwater scientific expedition was carried out by the National Institute of Oceanography in 1985 . It revealed significant biodiversity though the results are yet to be published.

See also
Coral reefs in India
List of reefs

References

Further reading
William Henry Rosser, James Frederick Imray. The Seaman's Guide to the Navigation of the Indian Ocean and China Sea Including a Description of the Wind, Storms, Tides, Currents, &c., Sailing Directions; a Full Account of All the Islands; with Notes on Making Passages During the Different Seasons. J. Imray & Son, 1867. p. 412.
Alfred Dundas Taylor, James Horsburgh. The India directory, for the guidance of commanders of steamers and sailing vessels, founded upon the work of J. Horsburgh. W. H. Allen & Co., 1874. p. 299.

Landforms of Maharashtra
Coral reefs
Underwater diving sites in India
Undersea banks of the Indian Ocean
Reefs of India